Ellie Blackburn (born 25 March 1995) is an Australian rules footballer playing for the Western Bulldogs in the AFL Women's (AFLW). She served as Western Bulldogs co-captain in 2019, and has served as the sole captain since the 2020 season. Blackburn is the Western Bulldogs games record holder with 58 games.

Blackburn was drafted by the Bulldogs in 2016 as a marquee signing prior to the inaugural AFL Women's season, and is a three-time AFL Women's All-Australian and dual Western Bulldogs best and fairest. In 2017, she was the inaugural Western Bulldogs leading goalkicker, and in 2018, she captained the Bulldogs to their first AFL Women's premiership in the absence of suspended captain Katie Brennan. Blackburn was also voted as the AFL Players Association (AFLPA) AFLW best captain in 2021.

Early life
Blackburn began playing competitive football in the under-9s division for the Beaconsfield Junior Football Club. 2011 saw her named player of the carnival at the national under-18 championships. In 2013, she was the captain of the Victorian side at the under 18 championships, where she was named the competition's best-and-fairest player. She was awarded under 18 All-Australian selection in 2011, 2012, and her final year of eligibility in 2013.

She attended high school at Hallam Senior College in Melbourne's outer east. She was drafted by Melbourne with the thirteenth pick in the inaugural women's draft in 2013 and represented the club in the women's exhibition games between 2013 and 2016. Over this time she averaged 20 disposals per match for the club. In July 2016, Blackburn was signed by the  – the team that she played against in all of the exhibition matches – as one of two marquee players ahead of the inaugural AFL Women's season.

AFL Women's career

Blackburn was announced as a member of the Bulldogs' inaugural four-woman leadership group in late January 2017. Blackburn made her debut in round 1, 2017, against  at Whitten Oval. She was named among the Bulldogs' best, recording twelve disposals and kicking her first league goal in the match. In round 3, Blackburn was named the Bulldogs' best, recording a team high twenty-six disposals and six tackles for the match. Blackburn was highlighted as "Player of the Week" by the AFL Players Association for her round 5 performance in the 2017 AFL Women's season. At the end of the season, Blackburn was second in the competition for kicks, one behind 's Karen Paxman. Teammates also spoke highly of her leadership after she captained the team for majority of the season, with captain Katie Brennan injured. At the end of the 2017 season, Blackburn was nominated by her teammates for the AFL Players' Most Valuable Player Award and was listed in the 2017 AFL Women's All-Australian team. In May 2017, she was announced as the co-winner of the inaugural Western Bulldogs best and fairest award alongside Emma Kearney. The Western Bulldogs signed Blackburn for the 2018 season during the trade period in May 2017. On 2 September, Blackburn played for Victoria in the inaugural AFL Women's State of Origin match, where she was named among Victoria's best players with three goals.

In round 4 of the 2019 season, Blackburn was knocked out in a collision and stretchered off the ground in a neck brace.

Leading into the 2020 season, womens.afl journalist Sarah Black named Blackburn at no. 10 on her list of the top 30 players in the AFLW. Despite suffering a hand injury in a practice match, she was able to play in round 1, and was selected in womens.afls Team of the Week for that round. Blackburn was selected in the initial 40-woman squad for the 2020 AFL Women's All-Australian team, and was also selected in the AFL Players Association's 2017–2019 retrospective AFL Women's 22under22 team.

Leading into the 2021 season, Sarah Black again named Blackburn at no. 10 on her annual list of the top 30 players in the AFLW. Blackburn was best afield in each of the Bulldogs' first three matches and was selected in womens.afls Team of the Week in each of the first three rounds, making her one of only two players (along with 's Alyce Parker) to do so. She also received a Goal of the Year nomination for her goal in the final quarter of the round 1 match. At the end of the home-and-away season, Blackburn was voted as the AFLW Players' best captain for 2021 ahead of Melbourne captain and three-time winner Daisy Pearce, and also finished third in voting for the AFLW Players' most valuable player award behind  co-captain Brianna Davey and Fremantle midfielder Kiara Bowers. She also finished equal-third with Parker in the 2021 AFL Women's best and fairest count with 14 votes, one behind joint winners Davey and Bowers, and won her third AFL Women's All-Australian selection and second Western Bulldogs best and fairest award. Blackburn signed a contract extension with the club in June 2021.

Blackburn was named at no. 4 in Sarah Black's 2022 list of the top 30 players in the AFLW, which was Blackburn's first appearance in the top five. She was named the Bulldogs' best player in their opening round loss to Melbourne, before being ruled out of the following round due to the AFL's health and safety protocols, which would have been the first time she missed a match for the club. However, the Bulldogs' next two matches were postponed as a result of the protocols, and Blackburn played in the Bulldogs' next match, a loss to Greater Western Sydney in round 4; she was named among their best players with twelve disposals, eight tackles and a goal, with coach Nathan Burke saying that she only spent two minutes in the midfield in the second half of the match after "[running] herself ragged", as one of several players who had played underdone after having COVID-19. Blackburn was again named among the Bulldogs' best players in their loss to Fremantle a few days later and was best afield in the Bulldogs' first win of the season against  in round 5, polling eight coaches' votes.

Statistics
Updated to the end of S7 (2022).

|-
| 2017 ||  || 2
| 7 || 6 || bgcolor=CAE1FF | 12† || 101 || 35 || 136 || 17 || 26 || 0.9 || bgcolor=CAE1FF | 1.7† || 14.4 || 5.0 || 19.4 || 2.4 || 3.7 || 10
|-
| bgcolor=F0E68C | 2018# ||  || 2
| 8 || 3 || 6 || 102 || 33 || 135 || 23 || 26 || 0.4 || 0.9 || 12.8 || 4.1 || 16.9 || 2.9 || 3.3 || 6
|-
| 2019 ||  || 2
| 7 || 2 || 3 || 86 || 35 || 121 || 19 || 27 || 0.3 || 0.4 || 12.3 || 5.0 || 17.3 || 2.7 || 3.9 || 6
|-
| 2020 ||  || 2
| 6 || 2 || 2 || 72 || 32 || 104 || 13 || 25 || 0.3 || 0.3 || 12.0 || 5.3 || 17.3 || 2.2 || 4.2 || 6
|-
| 2021 ||  || 2
| 9 || 5 || 4 || 124 || 52 || 176 || 35 || 48 || 0.6 || 0.4 || 13.8 || 5.8 || 19.6 || 3.9 || 5.3 || 14
|-
| 2022 ||  || 2
| 10 || 6 || 8 || 135 || 66 || 201 || 23 || 43 || 0.6 || 0.8 || 13.5 || 6.6 || 20.1 || 2.3 || 4.3 || 12
|-
| S7 (2022) ||  || 2
| 11 || 4 || 7 || 152 || 63 || 215 || 28 || 58 || 0.4 || 0.6 || 13.8 || 5.7 || 19.5 || 2.5 || 5.3 || 14
|- class=sortbottom
! colspan=3 | Career
! 58 !! 28 !! 42 !! 772 !! 316 !! 1088 !! 158 !! 253 !! 0.5 !! 0.7 !! 13.3 !! 5.4 !! 18.8 !! 2.7 !! 4.4 !! 68
|}

Honours and achievements
Team
 AFL Women's premiership player: 2018
 AFL Women's minor premiership: 2018

Individual
 Western Bulldogs captain: 2019–present (co-captain 2019)
 AFL Women's premiership captain: 2018
 Western Bulldogs games record holder
 3× AFL Women's All-Australian team: 2017, 2018, 2021
 Western Bulldogs best and fairest: 2017
 AFLPA AFLW best captain: 2021
 Western Bulldogs leading goalkicker: 2017
 Victoria representative honours in AFL Women's State of Origin: 2017
 AFL Women's 2017–2019 22under22 team

References

External links

 
 
 

Living people
1994 births
Western Bulldogs (AFLW) players
Australian rules footballers from Victoria (Australia)
All-Australians (AFL Women's)
Melbourne University Football Club (VFLW) players